Xiong Qinglai, or Hiong King-Lai (October 20, 1893 – February 3, 1969), courtesy name Dizhi, was a Chinese mathematician from Yunnan. He was the first person to introduce modern mathematics into China, and served as an influential president of Yunnan University from 1937 through 1947. A Chinese stamp was issued in his honour.

Biography
Xiong was born in Xizhai village (nowadays named Qinglai village to honour him) of Mile County, Yunnan province. He studied in Europe for eight years (1913 to 1921) before returning to China to teach. During that time, Chinese university-level mathematics was only comparable to Western secondary-school mathematics level. In 1921, he established the Department of Mathematics of National Southeastern University (Later renamed National Central University and Nanjing University), beginning undertook the task of writing more than ten textbooks on geometry, calculus, differential equations, mechanics, etc. It was the first endeavor in history to introduce modern mathematics in Chinese textbooks. In 1926, Xiong became a professor of mathematics at Tsinghua University, where he influenced the path of Hua Luogeng, who later became another prominent mathematician.

Xiong was persecuted to death in 1969 during the Cultural Revolution.

On 20 November 1992, China Post issued a stamp commemorating Xiong Qinglai as part of the third set of its "Modern Chinese Scientists" stamp series (serial number 1992-19). 76 million copies were printed.

References

External links
 China Stamps 1992-19 Scott 2416-19 Modern Chinese Scientists (3rd series)

1893 births
1969 deaths
Educators from Yunnan
Mathematicians from Yunnan
Academic staff of the National Central University
Academic staff of Nanjing University
People from Honghe
People persecuted to death during the Cultural Revolution
Presidents of Yunnan University
Republic of China politicians from Yunnan
Academic staff of Tsinghua University
Academic staff of Yunnan University